Oskoruša is a hill close to the city of Smederevska Palanka, Serbia.

Description
Also visible are the mountain Rtanj, the mountain Devica near the city of Niš, the mountains Jastrebac, Avala, Kosmaj, Bukulja, Venčac, and Rudnik; and the cities of Požarevac, Kovin, Svilajnac, Velika Plana, Despotovac, Žabari, and Arandjelovac.

History
Less than one mile away is the archaeological site at Medvednjak. Research has been conducted at Medvednjak by University of California, Los Angeles. It is assumed that Oskoruša was the site of a church that was destroyed in the 17th century by a landslide.

References

Hills of Serbia